Novello is a surname of Italian origin. Notable people with the surname include:

 Agostino Novello (13th century), Italian religious figure
 Alfred Novello (1810–1896), English music publisher, son of Vincent Novello
 Antonia Novello (born 1944), Puerto Rican physician
 Charles Novello (1886–1935), American lawyer and politician
 Clara Novello (1818–1908), British singer
 Don Novello (born 1943), American actor and comedian
 Ivor Novello (1893–1951), Welsh singer, composer and entertainer, son of Clara Novello Davies
 Jay Novello (1904–1982), American actor
 Marie Novello (1898–1928), Welsh pianist, daughter of Clara Novello Davies
 Mary Novello (1809–1898), English author, daughter of Vincent Novello
 Vincent Novello (1781–1861), English musician

See also 

 Novello (disambiguation)
 Novelli (surname)

Italian-language surnames